Patrick Salmon (born 1952) is a historian of diplomatic history with a focus on Scandinavia.

He is a chief historian at the Foreign and Commonwealth Office and a visiting professor at Newcastle University. In 2001 he was a fellow at the Norwegian Nobel Institute. He is a member of the Norwegian Academy of Science and Letters.

Bibliography
Scandinavia and the Great Powers 1890–1940 (Cambridge University Press, 1997).

"Norway", in Neville Wylie (Editor), European Neutrals and Non-Belligerents During the Second World War (Cambridge University Press, 2002).

The Baltic Nations and Europe: Estonia, Latvia and Lithuania in the 20th century, eds. John Hiden and Patrick Salmon (Routledge, 2014).

References 

1952 births
Living people
British historians
Academics of Newcastle University
Members of the Norwegian Academy of Science and Letters